Željko Gavrilović (Serbian Cyrillic: Жeљкo Гaвpилoвић; born December 6, 1971 in Titovo Užice) is a former Serbian footballer.

External sources
 
 Stats in Ligadehonra.

1971 births
Living people
Serbian footballers
FK Obilić players
C.D. Nacional players
C.F. União players
Primeira Liga players
Expatriate footballers in Portugal
Association football defenders
South China AA players
Paniliakos F.C. players
Expatriate footballers in Greece
Békéscsaba 1912 Előre footballers
Expatriate footballers in Hungary
Hong Kong First Division League players
Expatriate footballers in Hong Kong
FK Vojvodina players
FK Modriča players
Serbian expatriate sportspeople in Hong Kong
Sing Tao SC players